Micranthes texana, commonly called Texas saxifrage, is a species of plant in the saxifrage family that is native to Texas, Oklahoma, Arkansas, Missouri, Louisiana and Nebraska with a disjunct occurrence in Georgia.

References

Flora of North America
Plants described in 1903
texana